Herbert Leroy Conyers (January 8, 1921 – September 16, 1964) was an American professional baseball player whose career lasted for nine seasons (1941–1942; 1946–1952). A first baseman, he appeared in seven Major League games for the Cleveland Indians during the  season.

Conyers spent almost all of his pro career in the Cleveland minor league organization. His trial with the 1950 Indians came at the beginning and tail end of the season.  After going two for four with a base on balls as a pinch hitter between April 18 and May 17, he spent the bulk of the season with Cleveland's two top farm teams, the Oklahoma City Indians and the San Diego Padres. Recalled late in the campaign, he started his final MLB game on October 1 against the Detroit Tigers; he garnered only one hit in five at bats, but it was a solo home run off Marlin Stuart that ignited a five-run eighth-inning rally and enabled the Indians to overtake the Tigers, 7–5.

Conyers died at age 43 from cancer in Cleveland, Ohio. He was buried at nearby Knollwood Cemetery.

References

Bibliography

External links

1921 births
1964 deaths
Appleton Papermakers players
Baltimore Orioles (IL) players
Baseball players from Missouri
Birmingham Barons players
Cleveland Indians players
Dallas Eagles players
Dayton Indians players
Deaths from cancer in Ohio
Harrisburg Senators players
Indianapolis Indians players
Major League Baseball first basemen
Oklahoma City Indians players
San Diego Padres (minor league) players
Wausau Timberjacks players
Wilkes-Barre Barons (baseball) players
Burials at Knollwood Cemetery